Links to nations or nationalities point to articles with information on that nation's poetry or literature.  For example, United Kingdom links to English poetry and Indian links to Indian poetry.

Events
 January 19 - Starting this year, and continuing to at least 2009, an anonymous black-clad person, who enters popular lore as the Poe Toaster, appears in Baltimore at the Westminster Hall and Burying Ground tomb of American poet Edgar Allan Poe early on the morning of Poe's birthday.  The man toasts Poe with Cognac and leaves three red roses at the grave (along with the remainder of the Cognac).
 February 19 - Ezra Pound is awarded the first Bollingen Prize in poetry by the Bollingen Foundation and Yale University provoking a storm of criticism because of his pro-Fascist activities before and during World War II.
 March - Pablo Neruda flees Chile over the Lilpela Pass through the Andes to Argentina on horseback carrying a manuscript of his Canto General.
 April 14 - Roy Campbell punches Stephen Spender on the nose at a poetry reading in London.
 October - Publication begins in Italy of L'inferno di Topolino, a graphic parody of Dante's Inferno featuring Mickey Mouse with text and verse by Guido Martina.
 Indonesian poet Chairil Anwar writes his last poem, "Cemara Menderai Sampai Jauh" ("Fir Trees Are Sown Off Into the Distance"), prior to his death aged 26 on April 28.
 Greek Communist poet Yannis Ritsos, incarcerated during the Communist–centrist/rightist struggle in the Greek Civil War, writes poems which will ultimately see publication twenty-six years later, in the 1975 book, Petrinos khronos.
 George Hill Dillon, editor of the journal Poetry since 1937, relinquishes his post.
 First issue of Caribbean Quarterly, the flagship journal on culture edited at the University of the West Indies, spotlights Caribbean poetry.

Works published in English
Listed by nation where the work was first published and again by the poet's native land, if different; substantially revised works listed separately:

Canada
 Raymond Knister, Collected Poems ed. Dorothy Livesay.
 James Reaney, The Red Heart. Governor General's Award 1949.

India, in English
 Sri Aurobindo, Chitrangada ( Poetry in English ), Bombay: Sri Aurobindo Circle,

New Zealand
 Allen Curnow:
 The Axe, a verse play with a Pacific setting (Caxton)
 At Dead Low Water and Sonnets (Caxton)
 Basil Dowling, Canterbury

United Kingdom
 Dannie Abse, After Every Green Thing
 Edward Andrade, Poems and Songs
 Roy Campbell, Collected Poems, Volume 1 (Volume 2 1957, Volume 3 (consisting of translations) 1960)
 C. Day-Lewis, Collected Poems, published in March, although the book states "1948" (see also Collected Poems 1954)
 William Empson, Collected Poems of William Empson
 Roy Fuller, Epitaphs and Occasions
 Robert Garioch Sutherland, writing under the name "Robert Garioch", Chuckles on the Cairn
 W. S. Graham, The White Threshold
 Geoffrey Grigson, editor, Poetry of the Present, anthology
 Christopher Hassall, The Slow Night, and Other Poems 1940–8
 James Kirkup, editor, Leeds University Poetry, including work by Kirkup, Wilfred Rowland Childe, Derrick Metcalfe, and Kenneth Muir (Hull: Lotus Press)
 Louis MacNeice, Collected Poems 1925–48
 Edwin Muir, The Labyrinth
 Kathleen Raine, The Pythoness, and Other Poems
 James Reeves, The Imprisoned Sea
 Edith Sitwell, The Canticle of the Rose: Poems 1917–1949
 Stephen Spender, The Edge of Being
 W. B. Yeats (d. 1939), Poems, "The Definitive Edition", Irish poet published in the United Kingdom

United States
 Conrad Aiken:
 The Divine Pilgrim
 Skylight One
 Joseph Payne Brennan, Heart of Earth (Decker Press)
 Gwendolyn Brooks, Annie Allen
 John Ciardi, Live Another Day
 Hilda Doolittle, writing under the pen name "H. D.", By Avon River
 Kenneth Fearing, Stranger at Coney Island
 Robert Frost, Complete Poems
 Langston Hughes, One-Way Ticket
 Kenneth Patchen:
 Red Wine & Yellow Hair
 To Say If You Love Someone
 Ezra Pound, Selected Poems
 Kenneth Rexroth:
 The Signature of All Things
 The Art of Worldly Wisdom", Prairie City, Illinois: Decker Press
 Louis Simpson, The Arrivistes
 Donald A. Stauffer, The Golden Nightingale: Essays on Some Principles of Poetry in the Lyrics of William Butler Yeats, New York: Macmillan, United States criticism
 Peter Viereck, The Poet in the Machine Age
 William Carlos Williams:
 Paterson, Book III
 Selected Poems

Other in English
 Judith Wright, Woman to Man, Australian
 W. B. Yeats (d. 1939), Poems, "The Definitive Edition", Irish poet published in the United Kingdom

Works published in other languages

France
 Aimé Césaire, Corps perdu
 Paul Éluard, pen name of Paul-Eugène Grindel, ''Une leçon de morale
 Eugene Guilleveic, Gagner
 Pierre Jean Jouve, Diadème
 Henri Michaux, Poesie pour pouvoir, Paris: Drouin
 Pierre Reverdy, Main d'oeuvre: 1913–1949
 Claude Roy, Le Poète mineur
 Jules Supervielle, Oublieuse Mémoire
 Tristan Tzara, pen name of Sami Rosenstock, Phases

India
In each section, listed in alphabetical order by first name:

Marathi
 C. V. Karandikar, also known as Vinda Karandikar, Svedaganga, India, Marathi-language
 Manmohan, Yugayugance Sahapravasi, Indian, Marathi-language (later translated into Hindi under the title Marsal ki Salami)
 K. B. Nikumb, Ujjvala, Indian, Marathi-language
 Sarachchandra Muktibodh, Navi Malavat Indian, Marathi-language
 Shrikrishna Powale, Jala Mati, Indian, Marathi-language

Other languages of the Indian subcontinent
 Chittadhar Hridaya, Sugata Saurabha, a Buddhist epic, written in Nepal Bhasa, mostly in prison 1941-46, published in India
 Masood Husain, Urdu zaban aur adab, a history, written in Urdu of that language and its literature
 Nilakantha Shastri, translator, Sri Rama Carita, translation into Sanskrit of the Tamil-language Kamba Ramayana
 Pritam Singh Safir, Rakt Bundam, Indian, Punjabi-language
 S. Lalita, translator, Valarmati, translation into Tamil from the Indian poetry in English of Rabindranath Tagore's The Crescent Moon
 Sitaramaiah Kuruganti, Navyandhra Sahitya Vidhulu, a four-volume history in Telugu of that language's literature
 Umar Alisha, translator, Umar Khayyam, translation into Telugu from the Persian of Omar Khayyam's Rubaiyats

Other languages
Listed by nation where the work was first published and again by the poet's native land, if different; substantially revised works listed separately:
 Alfonso Calderón, Primer Consejo a los Arcangeles del Viento ("First Advice to the Archangels of the Wind"), Spanish-language, Chile
 Haim Gouri, Pirhei Esh ("Flowers of Fire, Years of Fire"), Israeli writing in Hebrew
 Eric Knudsen, Blomsten og sværdet ("The Flower and the Sword"), Denmark
 Alexander Mezhirov, Новые встречи ("New Encounters"), including "Communists, Ahead!", Russia
 Máirtín Ó Direáin, Rogha Dánta, Irish poet writing in Irish
 Carlos de Oliveira, Descida aos Infernos
 Nizar Qabbani, Samba, Syrian poet writing in Arabic

Awards and honors
 Consultant in Poetry to the Library of Congress (later the post would be called "Poet Laureate Consultant in Poetry to the Library of Congress"): Elizabeth Bishop appointed this year.
 Pulitzer Prize for poetry: Peter Viereck, Terror and Decorum
 Bollingen Prize: Ezra Pound
 Canada: Governor General's Award, poetry or drama: The Red Heart, James Reaney

Births
Death years link to the corresponding "[year] in poetry" article:
 January 2 – Jean Krier (died 2013), Luxembourger poet
 January 6 – Carolyn D. Wright (died 2016), writing as C. D. Wright, American poet
 January 25 – Tom Paulin, Northern Irish poet and critic of film, music and literature
 January 27 – Bruce Weigl, American poet and academic
 February – Agha Shahid Ali (died 2001), Indian-born English-language poet
 February 6
 Victor Hernández Cruz, Puerto Rico-born American poet
 Eliot Weinberger, American essayist and principal translator of Octavio Paz into English
 March 14 – Lynn Emanuel, American poet
 April 1 – Gil Scott-Heron (died 2011), African-American poet, jazz/soul musician and author
 April 13 – Marilyn Bowering, Canadian poet and novelist
 April 25 – James Fenton, English journalist, poet, critic and academic
 May 6 – Olga Broumas, Greek-born English-language poet in the United States
 May 13 – Christopher Reid, Hong Kong-born English poet, essayist, cartoonist, writer and exponent of Martian poetry
 May 15 – Alice Major, Scottish-born Canadian poet
 June 21:
 John Agard, playwright, poet and children's writer from Guyana, who moves to England in 1977
 Jane Urquhart, Canadian poet and author
 July 1 – Denis Johnson (died 2017), American writer
 July 5 – Pier Giorgio di Cicco (died 2019), Italian-Canadian poet
 July 24 – David St. John, American poet and academic
 July 31 – Mark O'Brien (died 1999), American poet
 August 1 – Jim Carroll (died 2009), American poet, author and punk musician
 August 2 – Bei Dao (北島, literally "Northern Island"), pseudonym of Zhao Zhenkai, Chinese poet, the most notable representative of the Misty Poets, a group of Chinese poets who react against the restrictions of the Cultural Revolution
 August 6 – Mary di Michele, Italian-born Canadian poet and writer
 August 14 – Jaroslav Erik Frič (died 2019), Czech poet, musician, publisher and underground culture figure
 September 11 – David Bottoms, American poet
 September 29 – Gabriel Rosenstock, Irish poet.
 November 21 – Liam Rector (died 2007), American poet, essayist and academic
 December 9 – Eileen Myles, American poet
 Also:
 Cathy Smith Bowers, American poet and teacher, North Carolina Poet Laureate, 2010–2012
 Barbara Ras, American poet

Deaths
Birth years link to the corresponding "[year] in poetry" article:
 March 2 – Sarojini Naidu (born 1879), Indian writing Indian poetry in English and political activist
 April 27 – Evan Morgan, 2nd Viscount Tredegar (born 1893), Welsh poet and occultist
 April 28 – Chairil Anwar (born 1922), Indonesian poet
 May 5 – Hideo Nagata 長田秀雄 (born 1885), Shōwa period Japanese poet, playwright and screenwriter (surname: Nagata)
 May 6 – Maurice Maeterlinck, Belgian poet, playwright and Nobel Laureate
 June 15 – Ulloor S. Parameswara Iyer, also known simply as "Ulloor" (born 1877), Indian, Malayalam-language poet, scholar and government official who published a five-volume history of Malayalam literature
 July 18 – Alice Corbin Henderson (born 1881), American poet
 July 25 – Lilian Bowes Lyon (born 1895), English poet
 September 9 – Fredegond Shove (born 1889), English poet
 December 28 – Hervey Allen (born 1889), American novelist and poet
 Joseph Lee (born 1876), Scottish war poet, artist and journalist

See also

 Poetry
 List of poetry awards
 List of years in poetry

Notes

20th-century poetry
Poetry